Gun laws in Minnesota regulate the sale, possession, and use of firearms and ammunition in the state of Minnesota in the United States.

Summary table

Permits to carry

As of March 1st, 2020 there were 301,268 permits issued in Minnesota.
The county sheriff must either issue or deny a permit within 30 days of the application date.
New and renewal permits are valid for five (5) years from the date of issuance. Emergency permits are valid for 30 days.
Landlords may not restrict the lawful carry or possession of firearms by tenants or their guests.
Private establishments can ban any firearms and must post a legal notice banning guns on their premises or personally notify patrons that guns are not allowed. (624.714 Subd. 17.b1)
Sheriff's departments which wrongfully deny an applicant (as determined by the courts) are responsible for reimbursing legal fees incurred by applicant.

Restrictions

Must be at least 18 years of age and a citizen or permanent resident of the United States
Must complete an application 
Must not be prohibited from possessing a firearm under Minnesota Statute 624.714 (Criminal background & mental health history check)
Must not be listed in the criminal gang investigation system
If a Minnesota resident, must reside in the county in which the application for a permit is made; non-residents may apply to any Minnesota county sheriff.
Must present evidence of training in the safe use of a pistol. (Training completed within one year of an original or renewal application. – 624.714, Subd. 2a)

Places Prohibited by statute

K-12 School property ∗ † ∗∗
A childcare center while children are present ∗∗
State correctional facilities or state hospitals and grounds (MN Statute 243.55)
Any jail, lockup or correctional facility (MN Statute 641.165)
Courthouse complexes, unless the sheriff is notified (MN Statute 609.66)
Offices and courtrooms of the Minnesota Supreme Court and Court of Appeals
In federal court facilities or other federal facilities (Title 18 U.S.C.§ 930)

∗ Public colleges and universities may make administrative policies prohibiting the carry of firearms by students and employees. However, such policies are not laws and do not have the authority of laws, nor may peace officers enforce such policies under the color of law.

∗∗ The carrying of firearms on school and day care facility property is allowed with written permission from the principal or other person in general control of the school, or the director of a child care center.  Exiting a vehicle with a firearm is only allowed to place the firearm in the trunk of the vehicle, unless written permission has been received.
 
∗∗∗ In 2015, this notification became automatic with the issuance of a permit. (MN Statute 609.66, Subd. 1g, paragraph c)

∗∗∗∗ Note, some stores may refuse to sell a long gun if one does not have a carry permit or permit to purchase a pistol, even if it does not have a pistol grip.

† With the exception of religious organizations, no public or private entity may prohibit the carry or storage of firearms within vehicles in parking lots.

Minnesota is a "shall issue" state for Permit(s) to Carry a Pistol openly or concealed.

Some counties have adopted Second Amendment sanctuary resolutions.

Sales

Private sales 
There are private seller regulations in Minnesota (Read here: https://www.revisor.mn.gov/statutes/?id=624.7132#stat.624.7132). Private sales do require a background check as per MN 624.7132.  The referenced Star Tribune article is not current or is in error.

A private seller is guilty of a gross misdemeanor if a private transfer is made to a prohibited person, who can be reasonably suspected as a prohibited person, who then uses or possesses the firearm during the commission of a felony crime of violence within one year of the transfer. 

 Minn. Stat.
 §§ 609.66, subd. 1f and 624.7132, subd. 12(1)

Gun shows 
All federally licensed firearms dealers must perform background checks at gun shows. All private sales within the state are subject to MN statute 624.7132 regardless of venue.

References

External links
Dps.State.mn.us
Minnesota State Statute 624.714
handgunlaw.us
leg.state.mn.us
Minnesota Handgun Law

Minnesota law
Minnesota